The Roman Catholic Diocese of Málaga  is a diocese located in the city of Málaga in the Ecclesiastical province of Granada in Spain.

History
 4 August 1486: Established as Diocese of Málaga

Special churches
Minor Basilicas:
Basílica del Dulce Nombre de Jesús Nazareno del Paso y Maria Santísima de la Esperanza, Málaga, Málaga, Andalucía

Leadership

Pedro Díaz de Toledo y Ovalle (5 Dec 1487 – 23 Aug 1499 Died)
Diego Ramírez de Fuenleal (7 Feb 1500 – 1518 Appointed, Bishop of Cuenca)
Raffaele Sansone Riario (12 Apr 1518 – 9 Jul 1521 Died)
Cesare Riario (3 Sep 1518 – 18 Dec 1540 Died)
Raffaele Sansone Riario (3 Sep 1518 – 9 Jul 1521 Died)
Bernardo Manrique, O.P. (18 Feb 1541 – 25 Sep 1564 Died)
Francisco Blanco Salcedo (13 Apr 1565 – 4 Jun 1574 Appointed, Archbishop of Santiago de Compostela)
Francisco Pacheco de Córdoba (30 Aug 1574 – 14 Jan 1587 Appointed, Bishop of Córdoba)
Luis García Haro de Sotomayor (7 Aug 1587 – 14 Aug 1597 Died)
Diego Aponte Quiñones, O.S. (31 Aug 1598 – 24 Apr 1599 Died)
Tomás de Borja y Castro (19 Jan 1600 – 30 Apr 1603 Appointed, Archbishop of Zaragoza)
Juan Alonso Moscoso (9 May 1603 – 21 Aug 1614 Died)
Luis Fernández de Córdoba (9 Feb 1615 – 26 Oct 1622 Appointed, Archbishop of Santiago de Compostela)
Francisco Hurtado de Mendoza y Ribera (14 Nov 1622 – 27 Jan 1627 Appointed, Bishop of Plasencia)
Gabriel Trejo y Paniagua (28 Apr 1627 – 12 Feb 1630 Died)
Antonio Henriquez Porres, O.F.M. (5 Sep 1633 – 20 Feb 1648 Died)
Alfonso de la Cueva-Benavides y Mendoza-Carrillo (27 Jul 1648 – 10 Aug 1655 Died)
Diego Martínez Zarzosa (31 Jan 1656 – 24 Jun 1658 Died)
Antonio Peña Hermosa (31 Mar 1659 – 11 Aug 1664 Appointed, Bishop of Jaén)
Alfonso Enríquez de Santo Tomás, O.P. (15 Sep 1664 – 30 Jul 1692 Died)
Bartolomé Espejos y Cisneros (13 Apr 1693 – 2 Mar 1704 Died)
Francisco de San José Pedro Mesía y Portocarrero, O.F.M. (15 Sep 1704 – 2 Feb 1713 Died)
Manuel de Santo Tomás y Mendoza, O.P. (11 Dec 1713 – 19 Aug 1717 Died)
Giulio Alberoni (6 Dec 1717 – 19 Nov 1725 Resigned)
Diego González Toro y Villalobos (19 Nov 1725 – 5 May 1734 Appointed, Bishop of Cuenca)
Gaspar de Molina y Oviedo, O.S.A. (5 May 1734 – 30 Aug 1744 Died)
Juan Eulate Santacruz (25 Jan 1745 – 16 Sep 1755 Died)
José de Franquís Laso de Castilla (24 May 1756 – 19 Sep 1774 Died)
José Molina Lario y Navarro (29 Jan 1776 – 5 Jun 1783 Died)
Manuel Ferrer y Figueredo (14 Feb 1785 – 21 Jul 1799 Died)
José Vicente Lamadrid (11 Aug 1800 – 9 Mar 1809 Died)
Ildefonso Cañedo y Vigil (19 Dec 1814 – 27 Jun 1825 Confirmed, Archbishop of Burgos)
Manuel Martínez Ferro, O. de M. (27 Jun 1825 – 3 Jun 1827 Died)
Juan Francisco Martínez y Castrillón (23 Jun 1828 – 11 Aug 1828 Died)
Juan Nepomuceno Gómez Durán (27 Jul 1829 – 30 Sep 1830 Died)
Juan José Bonel y Orbe (28 Feb 1831 – 29 Jul 1833 Appointed, Bishop of Córdoba)
José Gómez y Navas, T.O.R. (29 Jul 1833 – 26 Dec 1835 Died)
Salvador José Reyes y García de Lara (20 Jan 1848 – 5 Sep 1851 Confirmed, Archbishop of Granada)
Juan Nepomuceno Cascallana y Ordóñez (5 Sep 1851 – 26 Feb 1868 Died)
Esteban José Pérez Fernández (22 Jun 1868 – 16 Jan 1874 Appointed, Archbishop of Tarragona)
Zeferino González y Díaz Tuñón, O.P. (16 Jan 1874 – 21 Jun 1875 Resigned)
Esteban José Pérez Fernández (5 Jul 1875 – 8 Oct 1878 Died)
Manuel Gómez-Salazar y Lucio-Villegas (31 Dec 1878 – 10 Jun 1886 Appointed, Archbishop of Burgos)
Bl. Marcelo Spinola y Maestre (10 Jun 1886 – 2 Dec 1895 Appointed, Archbishop of Sevilla; beatified 1987)
Juan Muñoz y Herrera (2 Dec 1895 – 26 Dec 1919 Died)
St. Manuel González García (22 Apr 1920 – 5 Aug 1935 Appointed, Bishop of Palencia; canonized 2016)
Balbino Santos Olvera (5 Aug 1935 – 24 Nov 1946 Appointed, Archbishop of Granada)
Ángel Herrera Oria (24 Apr 1947 – 27 Aug 1966 Retired)
Emilio Benavent Escuín (7 Apr 1967 – 26 Aug 1968 Appointed, Coadjutor Archbishop of Granada)
Ángel Suquía Goicoechea (28 Nov 1969 – 13 Apr 1973 Appointed, Archbishop of Santiago de Compostela)
Ramón Buxarrais Ventura (13 Apr 1973 – 11 Sep 1991 Resigned)
Antonio Dorado Soto (26 Mar 1993 – 10 Oct 2008 Retired)
Jesús Esteban Catalá Ibáñez (10 Oct 2008 – )

See also
Roman Catholicism in Spain

References

Sources
 GCatholic.org
 Catholic Hierarchy
  Diocese website

Málaga
Roman Catholic dioceses in Spain
Religious organizations established in the 1480s
Roman Catholic dioceses established in the 15th century